No. 6 Branch is a rural locality in the Cassowary Coast Region, Queensland, Australia.

Geography 
The locality is bounded by the South Johnstone River to the west, north-west, and north, but then the river flows south through the locality and then forms part of the southern boundary.

Sugarcane is grown in the flatter land in the north and east of the locality around the South Johnstone River and also in the south of the locality around Mundiburra Creek. The sugarcane from the east of the locality is transported by a cane tramway to the South Johnstone Sugar Mill in South Johnstone.

In other areas, the predominant land use is grazing on native vegetation.

History

Education 
There are no schools in No. 6 Branch. The nearest government primary schools are South Johnstone State School in neighbouring South Johnstone to the east and Mundoo State School in Wangan to the north-east. The nearest government secondary school is Innisfail State College in Innisfail Estate to the north-east.

References 

Cassowary Coast Region
Localities in Queensland